The 1994 FIBA Europe Under-18 Championship was an international basketball  competition held in Israel in 1994.

Final ranking

1. 

2. 

3. 

4. 

5. 

6. 

7. 

8. 

9. 

10. 

11. 

12.

Awards

External links
FIBA Archive

FIBA U18 European Championship
1994–95 in European basketball
1994–95 in Israeli basketball
International youth basketball competitions hosted by Israel